Gianluca Maria Tavarelli (born  27 September 1964) is an Italian director and screenwriter.

Life and career 
Born in Turin, Tavarelli was self-taught, initially producing several Super8 and 16 mm short films. After directing several commercials, shorts and television documentaries, he made his feature film debut in 1994 with Take Me Away, which premiered at the Venice Film Festival and won the Grand Prix at the Annecy Film Festival. In 2001 he received two Silver Ribbon nominations for the film This Is Not Paradise, for best screenplay and best original story.
He has a daughter named Zoe who is an actress.

Selected filmography  
 
 Take Me Away (1994) 
 A Love (1999) 
 This Is Not Paradise (2000)
 Break Free (2003)
 Don't Make Any Plans for Tonight (2006)
 Another South (2014)

References

External links 
 

1964 births
Living people 
Film people from Turin
Italian film directors
Italian screenwriters
Italian male screenwriters